"The Crystal Spheres" is a science fiction short story by American writer David Brin, originally published in the January 1984 issue of Analog and collected in The River of Time. It won the Hugo Award for Best Short Story 1985.  In it, Brin presents an explanation for the Fermi Paradox.

Plot summary
Humanity's first attempt at interstellar space travel ends in disaster as the ship is destroyed near the edge of the Solar System by a transparent barrier.  They come to realize that Sol and every other Earth-like solar system are surrounded by "crystal spheres", while uninhabitable systems are not. Every attempt to break spheres around other systems from the outside fails. Radio waves and other attempts at communication from the outside are blocked as well. Humanity is thus prevented from expanding and colonizing the universe, as well as communicating with any intelligent life that's inside such a sphere.

The main character takes part in an expedition to a newly discovered habitable solar system with a shattered sphere. They discover the remnants of an alien civilization, the Nataral. From studying the Nataral's artifacts and writings, they learn that the only way to break the crystal spheres is from the inside. It appears as if the spheres have been put in place by someone/something to prevent any single civilization from dominating the universe. It is also discovered that the Nataral chose to go into a kind of suspended animation around a black hole, joining two even earlier species, to wait for the other civilizations of the universe to develop interstellar flight capabilities.

Authors notes 
In the author notes for this story, Brin outlines both sides of the Fermi paradox. He contrasts the Uniqueness view of Frank Tipler with the Contact view of Carl Sagan, and records some of the acrimony that surrounds the debate on the subject. He says he has won no friends by saying, in effect, “that we might gain more by careful thought and data collection than by yelling at each other.”

References

External links

Science fiction short stories
1984 short stories
Hugo Award for Best Short Story winning works
Works originally published in Analog Science Fiction and Fact
Works by David Brin